Cynomops milleri is a species of bat that is native to South America. It was previously considered a subspecies of the Para dog-faced bat.
It is considered a small- to medium-sized member of its genus.
It is classified as least concern by the International Union for Conservation of Nature because it appears to be common and widespread. It is found in Venezuela, French Guiana, Guyana, Suriname, Brazil, and Peru.

Taxonomy
Cynomops milleri was described as a new species in 1914 by American zoologist Wilfred Hudson Osgood.
Osgood initially placed it in the genus Molossops, with a scientific name of Molossops milleri.
The holotype had been collected by Malcolm Playfair Anderson near Yurimaguas, Peru.
Osgood noted that the eponym for the species name "milleri" was fellow zoologist Gerrit Smith Miller Jr.

Its taxonomy has fluctuated since its description, with Moras et al. saying the taxon had one of the most controversial histories of any Cynomops species.
In 1978, Koopman considered it a subspecies of the Southern dog-faced bat (Cynomops planirostris).
In 1998, Simmons and Ross published that it was synonymous with the Para dog-faced bat (C. paranus).
Most recently, it has been considered a full species.

Description
Overall, it is a smaller member of its genus.
Its back fur coloration varies from dark chocolate brown to light reddish brown.

Range and habitat
Cynomops milleri is found in northern and eastern South America where it is found in lowlands.

References

Taxa named by Wilfred Hudson Osgood
Mammals described in 1914
Cynomops
Bats of South America
Mammals of Colombia